Yichuan County is a county in northern Shaanxi Province, China, bordering Shanxi province to the east across the Yellow River. It is under the administration of the prefecture-level city of Yan'an.

Administrative divisions
Yichuan County is divided into one subdistrict, four towns, and two townships. The county's sole subdistrict, is the site of the county government.

Geography 

The county is located in northern Shaanxi, southeast of Yan'an's urban core. Yichuan County is part of the larger Loess Plateau. The Hukou Waterfall is located on the eastern border of the county.

Climate 

History 

Economy 
The county has been recognized by the Chinese Ministry of Agriculture as being a significant site for Zanthoxylum.

Culture 
The county has been recognized by the Chinese Ministry of Culture for its unique chest-drums.

Transportation 
Key highways which pass through the county include the G22 Qingdao-Lanzhou Expressway, China National Highway 309, Shaanxi Provincial Road 201, Shaanxi Provincial Road 204, and Shaanxi Provincial Road 303. The total length of highways in the county totals 1,557.5 kilometers. The Haoji Railway also passes through Yichuan County.

References

See also
 Hukou Waterfall
Loess Plateau
Northern Shaanxi

County-level divisions of Shaanxi
Yan'an